Le Parc may refer to:

Le Parc (album), 1985 album by Tangerine Dream
Le Parc (ballet), 1995 ballet by Angelin Preljocaj
Le Parc (novel), 1961 novel by Philippe Sollers
Le Parc, Manche, a commune in Manche, Normandy, France
Le Parc aux Bambous, park in Broques, Lapenne, Midi-Pyrénées, France
Le Parc Figueroa Alcorta, residential complex in Buenos Aires, Argentina
Le Parc tower, Buenos Aires, Argentina; one of the two towers there.
Le Parc (Ottawa), the fourth tallest building in the National Capital Region of Canada
Nickname for the Parc des Princes in Paris
Julio Le Parc (born 1928), Argentine artist